Montegalda is a town in the province of Vicenza, Veneto, Italy. It is east of SP20.

It borders with the other commune of Montegaldella, separated by the Bacchiglione river.

References

External links
Google Maps

Cities and towns in Veneto